Uttaradit Hospital is the main hospital of Uttaradit province, Thailand. It is classified under the Ministry of Public Health as a regional hospital. It has a CPIRD Medical Education Center which trains doctors for the Faculty of Medicine of Naresuan University. It is capable of tertiary care.

History 
The construction of Uttaradit Hospital started in 1940 during World War II, initiated by Khun Phra Samak Samoson, then governor of Uttaradit. The hospital opened on 12 April 1951. In 1999, the hospital made an agreement to train medical students and act as a clinical teaching hospital for the Faculty of Medicine, Naresuan University and about 30 students are trained here annually under the Collaborative Project to Increase Production of Rural Doctors (CPIRD) program.

See also 

 Healthcare in Thailand
 Hospitals in Thailand
 List of hospitals in Thailand

References 

 Article incorporates material from the corresponding article in the Thai wikipedia.

Hospitals in Thailand
Uttaradit province